Len Thompson (27 August 1947 – 18 September 2007) was an Australian rules footballer who played for the Collingwood Football Club, South Melbourne Football Club and Fitzroy Football Club in the Victorian Football League (VFL).

Collingwood
He was recruited by Collingwood from North Reservoir after he had initially trained with, and had been rejected by Essendon. Combining great physical size (200 cm, 95.5 kg) with tremendous athleticism, he provided Collingwood with a formidable around the ground presence.

Thompson played a total of 272 VFL games and scored 217 goals for Collingwood between 1965 and 1978, winning the club's best and fairest award a record 5 times, as well as the 1972 Brownlow Medal.

Players Strike
In the lead-up to the 1970 VFL season, Thompson and Collingwood captain Des Tuddenham, vice captain and club captain respectively, refused to play for Collingwood, going on strike to protest at the perceived unfair salaries being paid to lure interstate players east. After a three-week stand-off, Tuddenham and Thompson returned to the club without getting what they had asked, but their actions had resulted in improved pay for other players. The Collingwood committee responded by stripping Tuddenham and Thompson of their official leadership roles, with Terry Waters being appointed captain. While this protest resulted in temporary souring the relationship between Thompson and the Collingwood football club, Thompson returned to a leadership position quickly, as vice-captain 1973-7 and captain 1978.

South Melbourne and Fitzroy
Thompson later played seasons for both South Melbourne (20 games and 39 goals in 1979) and Fitzroy (13 games, 19 goals, 1980). However, in all of his sixteen season, 301-game VFL career with three senior clubs, he failed to play in a premiership team, despite appearing in four grand finals: the 1966 Grand Final (which Collingwood lost by one point), the 1970 Grand Final (which, despite being 44 points in front at half-time, Collingwood lost by 10 points), and the 1977 First Grand Final (which was a drawn match), and the 1977 Grand Final Replay (which Collingwood lost by 27 points) .

Interstate football
Thompson was a regular Victorian interstate representative, and achieved All Australian selection after the 1972 Perth Carnival. He served on the Collingwood board in 1982 and 1983. Thompson was selected as the first ruck in Collingwood's 'Team of the Century'.

Death
On 18 September 2007, Thompson died at the home of his former partner after a heart attack. He is survived by six children – Kari-Anne, Nicolas, Sam, Lachlan, Laura and Emily – and former partners Julie, Susi and Bronwyn. That day was 42 years after Thompson's debut for Collingwood.

Funeral
Len Thompson's funeral took place at Melbourne's St Paul's Cathedral at 10.30am on Thursday 25 September 2007.  Conducted by The Dean, The Very Reverend David Richardson, it was attended by more than 1,200 mourners, led by his six children and including notable members of the AFL fraternity, friends and fans.

Sons Nicolas, Sam and Lachlan contributed a poem and personal reflections, daughter Laura delivered a eulogy and Emily read a scripture (John 14: 1–6).

Tributes were delivered by Barry Breen (St. Kilda) & Gary Dempsey (Footscray and North Melbourne), Peter McKenna (Collingwood), John Nicholls (Carlton), Des Tuddenham (Collingwood), Mike Williamson (former professional athlete and  HSV 7 television commentator) and Eddie McGuire (Collingwood FC President) all of whom had long, close friendships with 'Thommo'.

Musical contributions were made by tenor Peter Brocklehurst (Ave Maria), Kate Ceberano (Wind Beneath My Wings) and Mike Brady sang 'One Day in September' in which he varied the lyrics to sing 'Thommo, you were part of this old town; In life you were the best man on the ground'.

The service ran for two hours and was a moving and celebratory tribute to one of the humblest champions to have consistently played at the elite level of any Australian sport.

Trivia 
In 1999 Thompson sold his Brownlow Medal for $75,000.

References

References
 Thompson L. & Nicholson, R., The Other Side of the Medal: Memoirs of Life and Football, Ironbark Press, (Chippendale), 1999.

External links

Profile at Collingwood Forever

1947 births
2007 deaths
Collingwood Football Club players
Copeland Trophy winners
Brownlow Medal winners
All-Australians (1953–1988)
Australian Football Hall of Fame inductees
Sydney Swans players
Fitzroy Football Club players
Preston Football Club (VFA) coaches
Australian rules footballers from Victoria (Australia)